A Year of Octobers is the first collaborative studio album by American rapper MC Paul Barman and record producer Celestaphone. It was released August 20, 2021, on Drumhex. Barman performs as virtual band member and alter ego YOUNGMAN on each song, except for "Guillotine", performed as himself. The album was produced entirely by Celestaphone.

Background 
The YOUNGMAN character was created during conversations MC Paul Barman had with rapper MF DOOM. Their earliest appearances include songs "YOUNGMAN Speaks on (((race)))" on 2018's (((echo chamber))), and "The Young Man Has A Point (Nurture)" from Milo's 2017 album Who Told You to Think??!!?!?!?!

Critical reception 

Brauch Owens of HipHopSince1987 stated "A YEAR OF OCTOBERS is one of a kind music masterpiece that transcends genres through a fusion of punk and hip-hop." OG Nick Marsh of Focus Hip Hop gave the album a 91 out of 100, saying, "Celestaphone’s dynamic, layered, detailed production is phenomenal, and YOUNGMAN’s whole existence is just further proof that MC Paul Barman is one of the best writers in Hip Hop right now."

Track listing
All tracks produced by Celestaphone.

Personnel
Credits for A Year of Octobers adapted from Bandcamp.

 Paul Barman as YOUNGMAN – art direction, lead vocals, recording engineer, rhymes
 Celestaphone – art direction, keyboards, mastering, mixing, producer, turntable
 Hunt Emerson – cover illustration
 Eli Gesner – recording engineer
 Suzanne Goldish – recording engineer
 Josh Grotto – cover colorist
 Alex Haught – layoutist
 Wayne Middleton – dog photo
 Steel Tipped Dove – recording engineer
 Billy Woods – featured artist

References

External links
 

2021 albums
MC Paul Barman albums
Celestaphone albums
Albums produced by Celestaphone
Collaborative albums